Arhopala aida  or white-stained oakblue, is a species of butterfly belonging to the lycaenid family described by Lionel de Nicéville in 1889. It is found in  Southeast Asia (Burma, Mergui, Thailand, Langkawi, Pulau Tenggol, Indochina, Hainan, and Peninsular Malaya).

Subspecies
Arhopala aida aida
Arhopala aida ophir (Evans, 1957) (Peninsular Malaya: Mount Ophir)

References

External links
"Arhopala Boisduval, 1832" at Markku Savela's Lepidoptera and Some Other Life Forms. Retrieved June 7, 2017.

Arhopala
Butterflies described in 1889
Butterflies of Asia
Taxa named by Lionel de Nicéville